John S. Watson (September 1892 – 1957) was an English professional footballer who played in the Football League for Birmingham.

Watson was born in Bulwell, Nottinghamshire. Before the First World War, he was on the books of Manchester City and Oldham Athletic without appearing in the League for either club. After the war, he played non-league football for Bloxwich Strollers before joining Birmingham in July 1919. A right back, Watson made his debut in the Second Division on 11 October 1919, deputising for Billy Ball in a home game against Blackpool which resulted in a 4–2 win. He started the next game, then lost the role of second-choice right back to Tom White, and was soon released to return to non-league with Measham Town.

Watson died in Nottingham in 1957.

References

1892 births
1957 deaths
People from Bulwell
Footballers from Nottinghamshire
English footballers
Association football fullbacks
Manchester City F.C. players
Oldham Athletic A.F.C. players
Bloxwich Strollers F.C. players
Birmingham City F.C. players
Measham Town F.C. players
English Football League players
Date of death missing